Events from the year 1920 in Canada.

Incumbents

Crown 
 Monarch – George V

Federal government 
 Governor General – Victor Cavendish, 9th Duke of Devonshire 
 Prime Minister – Robert Borden (until July 10) then Arthur Meighen
 Chief Justice – Louis Henry Davies (Prince Edward Island) 
 Parliament – 13th

Provincial governments

Lieutenant governors 
Lieutenant Governor of Alberta – Robert Brett 
Lieutenant Governor of British Columbia – Edward Gawler Prior (until December 12) then Walter Cameron Nichol (from December 24)
Lieutenant Governor of Manitoba – James Albert Manning Aikins    
Lieutenant Governor of New Brunswick – William Pugsley 
Lieutenant Governor of Nova Scotia – MacCallum Grant   
Lieutenant Governor of Ontario – Lionel Herbert Clarke 
Lieutenant Governor of Prince Edward Island – Murdock MacKinnon 
Lieutenant Governor of Quebec – Charles Fitzpatrick  
Lieutenant Governor of Saskatchewan – Richard Stuart Lake

Premiers 
Premier of Alberta – Charles Stewart   
Premier of British Columbia – John Oliver  
Premier of Manitoba – Tobias Norris  
Premier of New Brunswick – Walter Foster 
Premier of Nova Scotia – George Henry Murray 
Premier of Ontario – Ernest Drury   
Premier of Prince Edward Island – John Howatt Bell 
Premier of Quebec – Lomer Gouin (until July 9) then Louis-Alexandre Taschereau 
Premier of Saskatchewan – William Melville Martin

Territorial governments

Commissioners 
 Gold Commissioner of Yukon – George P. MacKenzie 
 Commissioner of Northwest Territories – William Wallace Cory

Events

January 10 – Canada is a founding member of the League of Nations, effectively ending the declaration of war.
February 1 – The Royal North-West Mounted Police and the Dominion Police are amalgamated and renamed the Royal Canadian Mounted Police
February 14 – Université de Montréal founded
February 26 – The Indian Act is amended to give Canadian aboriginal peoples the right to vote in band elections.
March 12 – The first Lions Club outside the United States is founded in Windsor, Ontario.
May 14 – Canadian Forum magazine founded
June – The Catholic Women's League is formed in Montreal
June 24 – Dollard des Ormeaux Monument unveiled
July 1 – Under the Dominion Elections Act, uniform franchise is established and the right for women to be elected to parliament is made permanent.
July 9 – Louis-Alexandre Taschereau becomes premier of Quebec, replacing Sir Lomer Gouin
July 10 – Arthur Meighen becomes prime minister, replacing Sir Robert Borden
July 11 – Charles Stephens, a barber and daredevil from Bristol, England, dies attempting to go over Niagara Falls.
October 17 – The first airplane to fly across Canada arrives in Richmond from Halifax.
December 25 – Walter Cameron Nichol becomes the 12th Lieutenant Governor of British Columbia

Date unknown
Esther Marjorie Hill (1895–1985) becomes the first female architect in Canada when she graduates from the University of Toronto.

Arts and literature
May 7 – The first exhibit of art by the Group of Seven opens in Toronto.
November 8 – The Capitol Cinema opens in Ottawa, the capital's only true movie palace.
Undated – A group of artists, educators, and art patrons formed the British Columbia Art League to lobby the provincial and city governments for a school.

Sport
January 10 – The Montreal Canadiens and Toronto St. Patricks combine for 21 goals to set an NHL record for most goals in a single game.
March 23–25 – The Ontario Hockey Association's Toronto Canoe Club win their first Memorial Cup by defeating Saskatchewan Amateur Hockey Association's Selkirk Fishermen 15 to 5 in a 2-game aggregate played at Arena Gardens in Toronto
April 1 – The NHL's Ottawa Senators win their ninth Stanley Cup by defeating the Pacific Coast Hockey Association's Seattle Metropolitans 3 games to 2. The deciding game was played at Toronto's Arena Gardens
December 4 – The University of Toronto Varsity Blues win their fourth and final Grey Cup by defeating the Toronto Argonauts 16 to 3 in the 8th Grey Cup played at Toronto's Varsity Stadium
1920 Olympics
April 26 – The Winnipeg Falcons representing Canada beat Sweden 12–1 to win the gold medal for ice hockey at the 1920 Olympics in Antwerp.
August 18 – Earl Thomson wins a gold medal in Men's 110 m Hurdles at the Athletics
August 23 – Bert Schneider wins a gold medal for Canada in the Boxing Welterweight at the 1920 Olympics in Antwerp.

Births

January to March

January 4 – James William Baskin, politician and businessman (d. 1999)
January 6 – Henry Corden, Canadian-born American actor, voice actor and singer (d. 2005)  
January 7 – Margaret W. Thompson, geneticist (d. 2014)
January 12 – Bill Reid, artist (d. 1998)
February 22 – Ralph Raymond Loffmark, politician. (d. 2012)
February 23 – Paul Gérin-Lajoie, lawyer, philanthropist, politician and Minister (d. 2018)
February 25
Merrill Edwin Barrington, politician, accountant and insurance broker (d. 1965)
Gérard Bessette, author and educator (d. 2005)
March 3 – James Doohan, actor (d. 2005)
March 9 – Erwin Schild, rabbi and author  
March 19 
 Cyril Lloyd Francis, politician and Speaker of the House of Commons of Canada (d. 2007)
 Laurent Noël, Roman Catholic bishop (d. 2022) 
March 24 – Bill Irwin,  Olympic skier (d. 2013)

April to June

April 2 – Gerald Bouey, 4th Governor of the Bank of Canada (d. 2004)
May 1 – Louis Siminovitch, molecular biologist (d. 2021) 
May 2 – William Hutt, actor (d. 2007)
May 5 – Bill Hunter, ice hockey player, general manager and coach (d. 2002)
May 8 
 Barbara Howard, sprinter (d. 2017) 
 Harry Rankin, lawyer and politician (d. 2002)
May 9 – Helen Nicol, baseball player (d. 2021) 
May 25 – Maria Gomori, Hungarian-born psychologist (d. 2021) 
May 27 – Peter Dmytruk, World War II military hero (d. 1943)
June 4 – Lynda Adams, diver (d. 1997)  
June 6 – Jan Rubeš, opera singer and actor (d. 2009)
June 11 – Qapik Attagutsiak, Inuit elder  
June 14 – Stanley Waters, Senator (d. 1991)
June 15 – Sam Sniderman, founder of the Sam the Record Man chain (d. 2012)
June 24 – Joe Greene, politician (d. 1978)
June 26 – Jean-Pierre Roy, Major League Baseball pitcher (d. 2014)

July to December
July 12 
 Pierre Berton, author, television personality and journalist (d. 2004)
 Bob Fillion, ice hockey player (d. 2015)
August 2 – Marcel Adams, businessman (d. 2020)  
August 3 – Lucien Lamoureux, politician and Speaker of the House of Commons of Canada (d. 1998)
August 12 – Aidan Maloney, politician and executive (d. 2018) 
August 19 – Agnes Benidickson, first female chancellor of Queen's University at Kingston, Ontario (d.2007)
August 24 – Alex Colville, painter (d. 2013)
September 4 – Catherine Bennett, baseball player 
September 6 – Helen Hunley, politician (d. 2010)
September 9 – Joan Neiman, senator (d. 2022)
September 11 – Dalton Camp, journalist, politician, political strategist and commentator (d. 2002)
September 26 – Edmund Tobin Asselin, politician (d. 1999)
October 1 – Charles Daudelin, sculptor and painter (d. 2001)
October 13 – Evelyn Dick, murderer
October 29 – Bill Juzda, ice hockey player (d. 2008)
November 11 – John Ferguson Browne, politician (d. 2014)
November 17 – George Dunning, Canadian-born cartoon director, animator (d. 1979)  
November 18 – George Johnson, politician and Lieutenant-Governor of Manitoba (d. 1995)

Deaths

January to June
February 12 – Aurore Gagnon, murder victim (b. 1909)
February 16 – Augustus F. Goodridge, politician and Premier of Newfoundland (b. 1839)
April 25 – Alexander Grant MacKay, teacher, lawyer and politician (b. 1860)
June 6 – James Dunsmuir, industrialist, politician and Premier of British Columbia (b. 1851)
June 18 – John Macoun, naturalist (b. 1831)
June 27 – Adolphe-Basile Routhier, judge, author and lyricist (b. 1839)

July to December
September 5 – Agnes Macdonald, 1st Baroness Macdonald of Earnscliffe, second wife of John A. Macdonald, first Prime Minister of Canada (b. 1836)
September 7 – Simon-Napoléon Parent, politician and Premier of Quebec (b. 1855)
September 18 – Robert Beaven, businessman, politician and 6th Premier of British Columbia (b. 1836)
September 30 – William Wilfred Sullivan, journalist, jurist, politician and Premier of Prince Edward Island (b. 1843)
November 19 – Byron Moffatt Britton, politician, lawyer and lecturer (b. 1833)
December 12 – Edward Gawler Prior, mining engineer, politician and Premier of British Columbia (b. 1854)

See also
List of Canadian films

Historical documents
Guide to improving your community by understanding its needs and resources

Funding is "not sufficient to meet our needs in buying food," and Indian residential school lacks enough garden space to make up for it

TB patient must follow sanatorium stay with home treatment and lifestyle change, including "winter living out of doors"

Anti-vaccination group seeks "judicial recognition [that] every freeman owns his own body"

Professor calls for better obstetrics training to lower high rate of injury to mothers

School improvements in Nova Scotia include hot lunches, stove polish and pencil sharpeners

Advocacy magazine says present civil servant compensation amounts to economic slavery

Wood Gundy co-founder insists on Christianity in global business

Nellie McClung wants newspaper articles about "heroism, generosity, neighborly kindness" more than crime stories

Stepmother of murdered child is sentenced to death

Disposition, care and management of general purpose Canadian horse breed known for its endurance

Witness before Senate committee on Hudson Bay envisions 50 million domestic reindeer on northern pasture, and muskox ranching too

Lawrence Lambe finds Hadrosaur fossil "Edmontosaurus" in good condition near Red Deer River, Alberta

References

 
Years of the 20th century in Canada
Canada
1920 in North America